An animal theme park, also known as a zoological theme park, is a combination of an amusement park and a zoo, mainly for entertainment, amusement, and commercial purposes. Many animal theme parks combine classic theme park elements, such as themed entertainment and amusement rides,  with classic zoo elements such as live animals confined within enclosures for display. Many times, live animals are utilized and featured as part of amusement rides and attractions found at animal theme parks.

Two examples of animal theme parks are Disney's Animal Kingdom in Orlando, Florida and Busch Gardens Tampa Bay in Tampa, Florida. These commercial parks are similar to open-range zoos and safari parks according to size, but different in intention and appearance, containing more entertainment and amusement elements (stage shows, amusement rides, etc.).

The term "animal theme park" can also be used to describe certain marine mammal parks, oceanariums, and more elaborate dolphinariums, such as SeaWorld, which offers amusement rides and additional entertainment attractions, and are also where marine animals such as whales are kept, contained, put on display, and are sometimes trained to perform in shows.

In 2010 the practice of keeping animals as trained show performers in theme parks was heavily criticized when a trainer was killed by an orca whale at SeaWorld Orlando in Florida.

List of animal theme parks

Zoological theme parks
Adventure World in Wakayama, Wakayama Prefecture, Japan
Bayern Park, Reisbach, Bavaria, Germany
Bali Safari and Marine Park in Bali, Indonesia
 Beto Carrero World in Santa Catarina, Brazil
Bellewaerde in Zonnebeke, Belgium
Big Rivers Waterpark & Adventures, in New Caney, Texas
Busch Gardens Tampa Bay in Tampa Bay, Florida
Busch Gardens Williamsburg in Williamsburg, Virginia
Chessington World Of Adventures in Surrey, England
Conny-Land in Lipperswil, Thurgau, Switzerland
Debrecen Zoo and Amusement Park in Debrecen, Hungary
Disney's Animal Kingdom in Lake Buena Vista, Florida
Dreamworld in Gold Coast, Australia
Drusillas Zoo Park in Alfriston, England
Eifelpark, Gondorf, Rhineland-Palatinate, Germany
Emerald Park in County Meath, Ireland
Erlebnispark Tripsdrill in Cleebronn, Baden-Württemberg, Germany
Flamingo Land in North Yorkshire, England
Fun Spot America in Orlando, Florida
Gatorland in Orlando, Florida
Happy Hollow Park & Zoo in San Jose, California
Hersheypark in Hershey, Pennsylvania
Higashiyama Zoo and Botanical Gardens in Chikusa-ku, Nagoya, Japan
Jaderpark in Wesermarsch, Lower Saxony, Germany
Kalahari Resorts in Sandusky, Ohio
Kemah Boardwalk in Kemah, Texas
Knoebels in Elysburg, Pennsylvania
Le Pal in Saint-Pourçain-sur-Besbre, France
Lion Country Safari in Loxahatchee, Florida
Lagoon in Farmington, Utah
Öland Zoo and Amusement Park in Färjestaden, Öland, Sweden
Panorama-Park Sauerland Wildpark in Rinsecke, North Rhine-Westphalia, Germany
Parc Safari in Hemmingford, Quebec
Safariland Stukenbrock in Stukenbrock, North Rhine-Westphalia, Germany
Santa's Village in Jefferson, New Hampshire
Seregeti Park in Hodenhagen, Lower Saxony, Germany
Six Flags Discovery Kingdom in Vallejo, California
Six Flags Great Adventure in Jackson, New Jersey
Taman Safari in Bogor, Indonesia
Tier- und Freizeitpark Thüle near Friesoythe, Lower Saxony, Germany
Tobu Zoo in Miyashiro, Saitama, Japan
Wild Adventures in Valdosta, Georgia
Wildlands Adventure Zoo Emmen in Emmen, Netherlands
Wildlife World Zoo in Litchfield Park, Arizona
Wild- und Freizeitpark Klotten in Klotten, Rhineland-Palatinate, Germany
Wild- und Freizeitpark Willingen in Willingen (Upland), Hesse, Germany
York's Wild Kingdom in York Beach, Maine

Marine theme parks (marine mammal parks and oceanariums)

Adventure World in Wakayama, Wakayama Prefecture, Japan
Aquatica in Orlando, Florida and San Antonio, Texas
Bali Safari and Marine Park in Bali, Indonesia
Boudewijn Seapark in Sint-Michiels, Bruges, Belgium
Conny-Land in Lipperswil, Thurgau, Switzerland
Discovery Cove in Orlando, Florida
Dolfinarium Harderwijk in Harderwijk, Netherlands
Epcot in Walt Disney World, Lake Buena Vista, Florida
Higashiyama Zoo and Botanical Gardens in Chikusa-ku, Nagoya, Japan
Kemah Boardwalk in Kemah, Texas
Legoland Deutschland in Günzburg, Germany
Marineland in Niagara Falls, Ontario, Canada
Ocean Park Hong Kong in Hong Kong, China
Scheels in Billings, Montana
Sea World in Gold Coast, Australia
SeaWorld San Antonio in San Antonio, Texas
SeaWorld San Diego in San Diego, California
SeaWorld Orlando in Orlando, Florida
Six Flags Discovery Kingdom in Vallejo, California
Story Land in Glen, New Hampshire
Yokohama Hakkeijima Sea Paradise in Yokohama, Kanagawa Prefecture, Japan

Zoos with amusement attractions

Most zoos have a carousel and/or Safari Train, but some zoos have more amusement attractions than that.
Affen- und Vogelpark Eckenhagen in Reichshof, North Rhine-Westphalia, Germany
 Features an indoor hall with playgrounds, carousels, trampolines, swing boats and a climbing wall
Bronx Zoo in New York City
 Features a monorail attraction, bug carousel, zip-line course, and obstacle course for children
Columbus Zoo and Aquarium in Powell, Ohio
 Features a carousel, boat ride (like an Old Mill ride but entirely outside), North American Wilderness Train, 3D cinema, camel ride, pony ride, three children's playgrounds, and it is combined with Zoombezi Bay and Rides At Adventure Cove
Fort Wayne Children's Zoo in Fort Wayne, Indiana
 Features a jungle carousel, safari train, log ride (like a log flume but with no lift hills or splash drops), and safari sky ride
Granby Zoo in Granby, Quebec
 Features a pony ride, camel ride, monorail, 3D cinema, carousel, Ferris wheel, roller coaster, pirate ship, bumper cars, indoor kids' playground, and water park
Hovatter's Wildlife Zoo in Kingwood, West Virginia
 Features a kiddie roller coaster, kiddie ferris wheel, and a kids' playground
Indianapolis Zoo in Indianapolis, Indiana
 Features a Jungle Carousel, Safari Train, family roller coaster, and Safari Sky Ride
Kolmården Wildlife Park in Norrköping, Östergötland County, Sweden
 Features three roller coasters, an aerial lift and a little amusement park themed after the cartoon character Bamse
Metro Richmond Zoo in Chesterfield County, Virginia
 Features a Safari Sky Ride, Jungle Carousel, Safari Train, kids' playground, and zip line
Natur- und Tierpark Brüggen in Brüggen, North Rhine-Westphalia, Germany
 Features a big playground with a monorail, a summer toboggan, a mini golf course and an electric horse riding track
Oakland Zoo in Oakland, California
 Features a Jungle Carousel, doughnut ride, plane ride, safari jeep ride, sky ride, Outback Train, family roller coaster, and kids' playground
Pittsburgh Zoo & Aquarium in Pittsburgh, Pennsylvania
 Features a carousel, log ride (like a log flume but with no lift hills or splash drops), safari train, and kids' playground
San Diego Zoo in San Diego, California
 Features a "Sky Safari" attraction, motion simulator experience, and double decker bus tour
San Diego Zoo Safari Park in Escondido, California
 Features a safari vehicular tour, hot air balloon experience, jungle carousel, and zip line course
Singapore Zoo in Singapore
 Features a vehicular tour, jungle carousel, pony ride, horse carriage ride, kids' playground, and water park
Toledo Zoo in Toledo, Ohio
 Features a Jungle Carousel, Safari Train, kids' playground, splash pad, and obstacle course
Wild- & Erlebnispark Daun in Daun, Rhineland-Palatinate, Germany
Features an 800 m long summer toboggan and a playground
Wild- und Freizeitpark Ostrittrum in Ostrittrum, Lower Saxony, Germany
Features a fairytale forest, two playgrounds, a lake with paddle boats and a local museum
Zoo Miami in Miami, Florida
Features a camel ride, kids’ playground, splash pad, monorail, and flume ride.

ZOOM Erlebniswelt Gelsenkirchen in Gelsenkirchen, North Rhine-Westphalia, Germany
Features a simulator ride and a huge indoor playground
ZooTampa at Lowry Park in Tampa, Florida
 Features a Shoot the Chute, jungle carousel, family roller coaster, bus tour, Outback Train, and miscellaneous rides for small children

See also
 Marine mammal park
 List of amusement parks

References

 
Oceanaria